The 2014 Ukrainian Super Cup became the eleventh edition of Ukrainian Super Cup, an annual football match contested by the winners of the previous season's Ukrainian Top League and Ukrainian Cup competitions.

The match was played at the Arena Lviv, Lviv, on 22 July 2014, and contested by league winner Shakhtar Donetsk and cup winner Dynamo Kyiv. Shakhtar won it 2–0.

Match

Details

2014
2014–15 in Ukrainian football
FC Dynamo Kyiv matches
FC Shakhtar Donetsk matches
Sport in Lviv